The 1974 NASCAR Winston Cup Series was the 26th season of professional stock car racing in the United States and the 3rd modern-era NASCAR Cup series. The season began on Sunday January 20 and ended on Sunday November 24. The first 15 races were shortened 10 percent due to the 1973 oil crisis.  Following criticism of the 1972 and 1973 points systems that placed emphasis on completed miles, NASCAR implemented a new points system, that took basic purse winnings, multiplied by number of starts, and divided by 1,000; it was designed to more directly reward winning races, a response to Benny Parsons' championship the previous year with just one win. Richard Petty was Winston Cup champion at the end of the season finishing 567.45 points ahead of Cale Yarborough, while David Pearson finished a strong third in points despite only nineteen starts. Earl Ross was named NASCAR Rookie of the Year.
	
1974 was the final season before Ricky Rudd, Bill Elliott and Dale Earnhardt joined the Winston Cup Grand National tour.

Races

Winston Western 500
Begun on January 20, the Western 500 at Riverside International Raceway was stopped by rain and resumed on January 26.  Cale Yarborough led 144 laps but was closely contested by Bobby Allison, who led 33 laps.  Allison faltered and finished a distant fifth, while Cale took the win with Richard Petty second.  David Pearson finished third in the final eligible race for the Wood Brothers 1971 Mercury Cyclone; the car had won 19 times with Pearson and A. J. Foyt the previous two seasons.

Top ten results

 11 - Cale Yarborough
 43 - Richard Petty
 21 - David Pearson
 72 - Benny Parsons
 12 - Bobby Allison
 88 - Donnie Allison
 16 - Gary Bettenhausen
 24 - Cecil Gordon
 98 - Richie Panch
 04 - Hershel McGriff

Daytona 500

Top ten results

 43 - Richard Petty
 11 - Cale Yarborough
 83 - Ramo Stott
 14 - Coo Coo Marlin
 50 - A. J. Foyt
 88 - Donnie Allison
 95 - Darrell Waltrip
 27 - Bobby Isaac
 32 - Dick Brooks
 30 - Walter Ballard

Richmond 500
Bobby Allison grabbed the win, his third with his own team since the start of 1973.

Top ten results

 12 - Bobby Allison
 43 - Richard Petty
 11 - Cale Yarborough
 54 - Lennie Pond
 2 - Dave Marcis
 48 - James Hylton
 70 - J.D. McDuffie
 90 - Bill Dennis
 64 - Elmo Langley
 67 - Buddy Arrington

Carolina 500
Cale Yarborough led most of the first half but his car's handling deteriorated throughout the race and Richard Petty dominated the second half en route to the win.

Top ten results

 43 - Richard Petty
 11 - Cale Yarborough
 12 - Bobby Allison
 28 - Charlie Glotzbach
 15 - George Follmer
 30 - Walter Ballard
 90 - Bill Dennis
 2 - Dave Marcis
 54 - Lennie Pond
 48 - James Hylton

Southeastern 500
Amid periodic snow flurries, a crowd of 18,000 witnessed Cale Yarborough win for the second straight spring Bristol race.  Richard Petty was hit in the driver side door in a four-car crash.

Top ten results

 11 - Cale Yarborough
 27 - Bobby Isaac
 72 - Benny Parsons
 12 - Bobby Allison
 88 - Donnie Allison
 24 - Cecil Gordon
 60 - Joe Mihalic
 48 - James Hylton
 68 - Alton Jones
 14 - Coo Coo Marlin

Atlanta 500
NASCAR mandated smaller carburetors for big-block engines.  David Pearson led the most laps in a small block but had to pit late for fuel, giving Cale Yarborough the win.

Top ten results

 11 - Cale Yarborough
 21 - David Pearson
 71 - Buddy Baker
 15 - George Follmer
 88 - Donnie Allison
 43 - Richard Petty
 95 - Darrell Waltrip
 57 - Bob Burcham
 16 - Gary Bettenhausen
 54 - Lennie Pond

Rebel 450
Darlington's spring race shaved 10 percent off its race distance as other races did, but did not lop off the opening 36 laps, it simply scheduled the race as a 450-miler.   David Pearson took his third straight Rebel race win (and fifth in all).  The race was stopped for half an hour when Lennie Pond smashed a guardrail and several posts were pushed off.  Cale Yarborough took the point lead.

Top ten results

 21 - David Pearson
 12 - Bobby Allison
 71 - Buddy Baker
 88 - Donnie Allison
 11 - Cale Yarborough
 16 - Dave Marcis
 28 - Sam McQuagg
 18 - Joe Frasson
 95 - Darrell Waltrip
 57 - Bob Burcham

Gwyn Staley Memorial
Richard Petty debuted a hand-built (by his brother, the team's chief engine builder Maurice) small-block Chrysler engine and won going away.  The win put him back into the point lead.  Petty stated the small block cost $50,000; “so we’re still in the red right now.”

Top ten results

 43 - Richard Petty
 11 - Cale Yarborough
 12 - Bobby Allison
 72 - Benny Parsons
 54 - Lennie Pond
 15 - George Follmer
 88 - Donnie Allison
 70 - J.D. McDuffie
 90 - Harry Gant
 2 - Dave Marcis

Virginia 500
Cale Yarborough lead almost wire to wire and the win gave him back the point lead.   Richard Petty finished second despite multiple pitstops.

Top ten results

 11 - Cale Yarborough
 43 - Richard Petty
 12 - Bobby Allison
 72 - Benny Parsons
 54 - Lennie Pond
 90 - Jimmy Hensley
 48 - James Hylton
 2 - Dave Marcis
 70 - J.D. McDuffie
 96 - Richard Childress

Winston 500

The lead changed 52 times among 14 drivers as David Pearson edged Benny Parsons.  During pitstops at Lap 105 crewman Don Miller lost a leg when he was hit by the spinning car of rookie Grant Adcox.

Top ten results

 21 - David Pearson
 72 - Benny Parsons
 43 - Richard Petty
 90 - Charlie Glotzbach
 54 - Lennie Pond
 2 - Dave Marcis
 14 - Coo Coo Marlin
 28 - Sam McQuagg
 11 - Cale Yarborough
 57 - Bob Burcham

Music City 420
Rain pushed the second half of the race from Saturday night to Sunday afternoon.   Richard Petty took his fourth win of the season and retook the point lead over Yarborough.  It was Neil Bonnett's first Winston Cup start.

Top ten results

 43 - Richard Petty
 88 - Donnie Allison
 95 - Darrell Waltrip
 57 - Bob Burcham
 2 - Dave Marcis
 15 - George Follmer
 70 - J.D. McDuffie
 05 - David Sisco
 14 - Coo Coo Marlin
 67 - Buddy Arrington

Mason-Dixon 500
Petty, Pearson, and Yarborough were the only leaders in a race interrupted only three times for yellows.   Petty, running the small-block Chrysler engine, led 210 laps but fell out with engine failure while leading with three laps to go.   Cale took the win having led 220 laps, while Pearson was second with only 20 laps led.

Top ten results

 11 - Cale Yarborough
 21 - David Pearson
 43 - Richard Petty
 72 - Benny Parsons
 15 - George Follmer
 54 - Lennie Pond
 2 - Dave Marcis
 93 - Jackie Rogers
 83 - Ramo Stott
 48 - James Hylton

World 600
David Pearson edged Richard Petty as the lead changed 37 times, the most for the race to that point of its history.  Buddy Baker left Harry Hyde's Dodge team to drive Bud Moore's Ford after Moore released driver George Follmer.  Baker led 94 laps before falling out with engine failure; he was signed to drive the rest of the season in Moore's Ford.

Top ten results

 21 - David Pearson
 43 - Richard Petty
 12 - Bobby Allison
 95 - Darrell Waltrip
 52 - Earl Ross
 2 - Dave Marcis
 81 - Dick Trickle
 31 - Jim Vandiver
 05 - David Sisco
 70 - J.D. McDuffie

Tuborg 400
George Follmer was fired from Bud Moore's team before the 600 and jumped into Roger Penske's AMC Matador; he won the pole but blew his engine after just seven laps.  Cale Yarborough edged Bobby Allison for the win, his sixth of the season.

Top ten results

 11 - Cale Yarborough
 12 - Bobby Allison
 72 - Benny Parsons
 24 - Cecil Gordon
 79 - Frank Warren
 48 - James Hylton
 68 - Sonny Easley
 37 - Chuck Wahl
 56 - Eddie Bradshaw
 89 - Don Reynolds

Motor State 400
This was the last race of the season shortened by NASCAR due to the energy crunch.  The lead changed 50 times among eight drivers, a new record for the track to that point.  Petty edged rookie Earl Ross after Pearson pitted under a late yellow for tires and the green never flew again.

Top ten results

 43 - Richard Petty
 52 - Earl Ross
 21 - David Pearson
 16 - Gary Bettenhausen
 42 - Marty Robbins
 96 - Richard Childress
 05 - David Sisco
 2 - Dave Marcis
 98 - Richie Panch
 24 - Cecil Gordon

Firecracker 400
David Pearson, the winner of the previous two 400s, pulled an audacious fake as he slammed his brakes to put Petty into the lead on the final lap, then drafted past at the stripe; Pearson's maneuver was such that an angered Petty confronted Pearson in the pressbox after the race; the ensuing dialogue was transcribed by The Charlotte Observer and published the next day (July 5, 1974, edition).  Some seven seconds behind them Cale Yarborough and Buddy Baker hit the stripe nose to nose for an official tie for third.  Bobby Allison took over Roger Penske's Matador; he led 50 laps but broke an intake valve late in the race and finished fifth.  The lead changed 45 times, a race record that stood until 2010.

Top ten results

 21 - David Pearson
 43 - Richard Petty 
 15 - Buddy Baker
 11 - Cale Yarborough
 16 - Bobby Allison
 28 - Bobby Isaac
 54 - Lennie Pond
 93 - Jackie Rogers
 05 - David Sisco
 24 - Cecil Gordon

Volunteer 500
Junior Johnson had purchased his race team from Richard Howard when Carling Breweries joined the #52 of Earl Ross along with Cale Yarborough's #11.  In the second race as owner of the team Junior saw Cale dominate but Buddy Baker surged to the lead late.  A caution set up a two lap sprint and Cale sideslammed Baker on the final lap for the win.  The race saw Neil Bonnett strike the inside pit guardrail, tearing up numerous support posts and requiring a 40-lap caution for repairs.

Top ten results

 11 - Cale Yarborough
 15 - Buddy Baker
 43 - Richard Petty 
 90 - Charlie Glotzbach
 12 - Bobby Allison
 24 - Cecil Gordon
 32 - Dick Brooks
 67 - Buddy Arrington
 2 - Dave Marcis
 30 - Walter Ballard

Nashville 420
Controversy marred Nashville's mid-summer event.  Following Richard Petty's crash a scoring controversy ensued involving Cale Yarborough and Charlie Glotzbach; Glotzbach was placed a lap down based on scoring, but Cale stayed on the lead lap.   Allison finished just behind Yarborough and drove into victory lane ahead of Yarborough, insisting Cale was a lap down.  NASCAR later said a scoring mistake had been made but that the Yarborough win would stand.

Top ten results

 11 - Cale Yarborough
 12 - Bobby Allison
 95 - Darrell Waltrip
 05 - David Sisco
 68 - Alton Jones
 90 - Charlie Glotzbach
 72 - Benny Parsons
 52 - Earl Ross
 67 - Buddy Arrington
 98 - Richie Panch

Purolator 500
Originally published in NASCAR's schedule, the annual 300-miler at Trenton Speedway was cancelled and replaced by Pocono's Purolator 500.  Richard Petty won the race as rain shortened the race by eight laps.  Buddy Baker won the pole; he'd also won the pole in late April in Pocono's USAC stock car 500-miler.  It was the inaugural race for NASCAR at Pocono, which has become part of the annual schedule since then.

Top ten results

 43 - Richard Petty
 15 - Buddy Baker
 11 - Cale Yarborough
 21 - David Pearson
 72 - Benny Parsons
 2 - Dave Marcis
 24 - Cecil Gordon
 77 - Jan Opperman
 93 - Jackie Rogers
 30 - Kenny Brightbill

Talladega 500
25 of the event's 50 entries were found sabotaged in the garage area on race morning.  NASCAR instituted several competition cautions to allow teams to find previously-undetected sabotage.  Buddy Baker fell out after leading 98 laps with rearend failure with three laps to go.  Petty sideswiped past Pearson at the stripe ("Pearson tried to cut me off," Petty said; "I'd rather rub fenders with Richard than compete clean with some of the other cats, who are crazy at times," Pearson added); it was Petty's third straight win.  Three days before the race A. J. Foyt brought his Coyote Indycar for a speed test; he hit 217 MPH, a closed-course record for the time.

Top ten results

 43 - Richard Petty
 21 - David Pearson
 12 - Bobby Allison
 11 - Cale Yarborough
 72 - Benny Parsons
 15 - Buddy Baker
 83 - Ramo Stott
 28 - Bobby Isaac
 42 - Marty Robbins
 52 - Earl Ross

Yankee 400
Pearson won for the first time since Daytona in July, beating Petty by some five seconds.  The lead changed 45 times as Cale Yarborough led 60 laps but lost contact with the leaders  after a late tire change backfired with mismatched tires.

Top ten results

 21 - David Pearson
 43 - Richard Petty
 11 - Cale Yarborough
 15 - Buddy Baker
 12 - Bobby Allison
 52 - Earl Ross
 2 - Dave Marcis
 32 - Dick Brooks
 05 - David Sisco
 98 - Richie Panch

Southern 500

Cale Yarborough took his third win in the race after melees eliminated half the field; Richard Petty, Bobby Allison and Buddy Baker were notable crash victims, and rookie Richie Panch was singled out for criticism after being involved in three wrecks.  Sophomore Darrell Waltrip took second.  NASCAR's 1974 point system, which took purse winnings multiplied by number of starts divided by 1,000, came under fire when Petty wrecked early yet outpointed every car that finished ahead of him except race-winner Yarborough.

Top ten results

 11 - Cale Yarborough
 95 - Darrell Waltrip
 05 - David Sisco
 2 - Dave Marcis
 48 - James Hylton
 49 - G.C. Spencer
 93 - Jackie Rogers
 07 - Jerry Schild
 18 - Joe Frasson
 67 - Pee Wee Wentz

Capital City 500
Cale Yarborough led 98 of the first 120 laps but the pavement was grinding up and Cale slipped in loose asphalt and crashed.  The wreck put Richard Petty into the lead for the remaining 380 laps.  Bobby Allison, originally entered in the race, did not race.

Top ten results

 43 - Richard Petty
 72 - Benny Parsons
 98 - Richie Panch
 90 - Charlie Glotzbach
 30 - Walter Ballard
 64 - Elmo Langley
 9 - Tony Bettenhausen Jr.
 70 - J. D. McDuffie
 24 - Cecil Gordon
 54 - Lennie Pond

Delaware 500
Petty led 491 laps and put the entire field three laps down while Yarborough fell out with engine failure.

Top ten results

 43 - Richard Petty
 15 - Buddy Baker
 52 - Earl Ross
 72 - Benny Parsons
 2 - Dave Marcis
 05 - David Sisco
 24 - Cecil Gordon
 83 - Kenny Brightbill
 19 - Henley Gray
 30 - Walter Ballard

Wilkes 400
Petty and Yarborough swept the front row and led 391 laps.  Cale led for 275 laps.   Petty lost a lap on late pitstops but unlapped himself; he had to settle for second when a late yellow ended the race under caution.

Top ten results

 11 - Cale Yarborough
 43 - Richard Petty
 15 - Buddy Baker 
 52 - Earl Ross
 2 - Dave Marcis
 28 - Bobby Isaac
 96 - Richard Childress
 93 - Jackie Rogers
 30 - Walter Ballard
 05 - David Sisco

Old Dominion 500

Earl Ross pulled off the upset win, the first for a rookie since 1965 and first for a Canadian driver ever.  The win came after teammate Cale Yarborough crashed.

Top ten results

 52 - Earl Ross
 15 - Buddy Baker
 88 - Donnie Allison
 2 - Dave Marcis
 98 - Richie Panch
 48 - James Hylton
 64 - Elmo Langley
 79 - Frank Warren
 67 - Satch Worley
 25 - Jabe Thomas

National 500

David Pearson made up a lap lost in the first 100 laps of the race and edged Richard Petty, who erased a two-lap deficit despite a pit fire three-quarters into the race; it was the fifth time in the season Pearson and Petty finished together in the top two and Pearson's fourth win in that rivalry.  The race was chaotic as a ten-car melee erupted on the third lap and a vicious two-car crash in Turn Four eliminated Grant Adcox and Ramo Stott.  The lead changed 47 times, a race record that was tied in 2000, and a track record that lasted until the 1979 World 600, among 11 drivers; it was the sixth race of the season to break 40 official lead changes.

Top ten results

 21 - David Pearson
 43 - Richard Petty
 95 - Darrell Waltrip
 88 - Donnie Allison
 12 - Bobby Allison
 54 - Lennie Pond
 97 - Harry Jefferson
 2 - Dick Trickle
 19 - Bob Burcham
 35 - Dan Daughtry

American 500
Pearson grabbed his seventh win of 1974, edging Cale by two seconds.   The surface at North Carolina Motor Speedway proved hard on tires and pitstops became frequent.  Buddy Baker led twelve laps but fell out after only eighteen laps with brake failure.

Top ten results

 21 - David Pearson
 11 - Cale Yarborough
 43 - Richard Petty
 12 - Bobby Allison
 95 - Darrell Waltrip
 88 - Donnie Allison 
 2 - Dick Trickle
 52 - Earl Ross
 72 - Benny Parsons
 93 - Jackie Rogers

Los Angeles Times 500
Originally left off of NASCAR's schedule, the race was added late in the season.  Richard Petty led the most laps but fell out late and finished 15th.  Bobby Allison took the win in Roger Penske's AMC Matador but was fined $9,100 for unapproved valve lifters in postrace inspection.  The race lead changed 38 times officially (a track record for stock cars) while several laps saw up to four lead changes in one circuit.

Top ten results

 12 - Bobby Allison
 21 - David Pearson
 11 - Cale Yarborough
 28 - A. J. Foyt
 15 - Buddy Baker
 95 - Darrell Waltrip
 83 - Ramo Stott
 52 - Earl Ross
 98 - Richie Panch
 70 - J. D. McDuffie

Season recap

Final Points standings

(key) Bold – Pole position awarded by time. Italics – Pole position set by owner's points. * – Most laps led. ** - All laps led.

References

External links
http://www.racing-reference.info/raceyear?yr=1974&series=W

 
Winston Cup Series
NASCAR Cup Series seasons